Thimphu District (Dzongkha: ཐིམ་ཕུ་རྫོང་ཁག་; Wylie: Thim-phu rdzong-khag) is a dzongkhag (district) of Bhutan. Thimphu is also the capital of Bhutan and the largest city in the whole kingdom.

Languages 
The dominant language throughout the district is Dzongkha; however, within the capital nearly every language of Bhutan may be encountered.

Administrative divisions
Thimphu District is divided into eight gewogs and one town (Thimphu):

Chang Gewog
Dagala Gewog
Genyekha Gewog
Kawang Gewog
Lingzhi Gewog
Mewang Gewog
Naro Gewog
Soe Gewog

Lingzhi, Soe and Naro Gewogs belong to the Lingzhi Dungkhag subdistrict, the only subdistrict within Thimphu District. The remaining gewogs do not belong to any subdistrict.

Environment
The northern half of Thimphu District (the gewogs of Kawang, Lingzhi, Naro and Soe – corresponding roughly to Lingzhi Dungkhag) is subject to environmental protection, falling within Jigme Dorji National Park.

See also 
Districts of Bhutan
Dungkhag
Thimphu Province

References

External links 

 

 
Districts of Bhutan